Arbanitis elegans is a species of spiders in the family Idiopidae found in New South Wales, Australia.

References

External links 

Idiopidae
Spiders described in 1918
Spiders of Australia
Fauna of New South Wales
Taxa named by William Joseph Rainbow